Panfil is a surname. Notable people with this surname include:

 Grzegorz Panfil (born 1988), Polish tennis player
 Ken Panfil (1930–2002), American football player
 Wanda Panfil (born 1959), Polish athlete